Elizabeth Orr Shaw (October 2, 1923 – July 23, 2014) was an American lawyer and politician. A Republican, she served in the Iowa House of Representatives for the 43rd district from 1967 to 1971 and for the 78th district from 1971 to 1973. She was a member of the Iowa Senate for the 40th district from 1973 to 1977.

Early life 
Shaw was born on October 2, 1923 in Monona, Iowa. Her parents were Harold T. and Hazel Kean Orr. She received a bachelor of arts degree from Drake University in 1945, where she was a member of Phi Beta Kappa. She also earned a masters of arts degree in public administration from the University of Minnesota in 1946. She attended the University of Iowa Law School, where she was a member of the Order of the Coif, graduating with her J.D. in 1948. She practiced law in Davenport, Iowa, and was a member of the Scott County Crime Commission. In 1946, she married Donald H. Shaw and the couple had three children: Elizabeth Ann, Andrew Hardy and Anthony Orr.

Political career 
Shaw was first elected to the Iowa House of Representatives for the 43rd district in 1966, serving as a representative for the Republican Party between January 9, 1967, and January 10, 1971. She was a representative for the 78th district from January 11, 1971, to January 7, 1973. Shaw was a representative for the 40th district in the Iowa Senate from January 8, 1973, to October 1, 1977. She was assistant minority leader during her final term in the Senate.

Later life 
Shaw died in Columbia, Maryland, on July 23, 2014.

Notes

1923 births
2014 deaths
People from Clayton County, Iowa
Politicians from Davenport, Iowa
Drake University alumni
University of Iowa College of Law alumni
Humphrey School of Public Affairs alumni
Iowa lawyers
Women state legislators in Iowa
Republican Party members of the Iowa House of Representatives
Republican Party Iowa state senators
20th-century American lawyers
20th-century American women lawyers
20th-century American women politicians
20th-century American politicians
21st-century American women